Power of Inner Strength is the debut album by American groove metal band Grip Inc. It was released on March 7, 1995.

Track listing

Personnel 
 Gus Chambers – vocals
 Waldemar Sorychta – guitar, backing vocals
 Jason VieBrooks – bass
 Dave Lombardo – drums, percussion

References 

1995 debut albums
Grip Inc. albums
SPV/Steamhammer albums
Albums produced by Waldemar Sorychta